India competed at the 1978 Asian Games held in Bangkok, Thailand. India ranked 6th with 11 gold medals.

Medals by sport

Nations at the 1978 Asian Games
1978
Asian Games